KY 3 may refer to:

 KY-3, a secure US federal government telephone system
 Kentucky Route 3
 Kentucky's 3rd congressional district
 The on-air branding for KYTV (TV) channel 3, an NBC affiliate in Springfield, Missouri